Spain, the host country of the 2010 European Athletics Championships held in Barcelona, was represented by 88 athletes (55 men and 33 women).

Medals

Results

Men
Track & road events

Field events

Combined events

Women
Track & road events

Field events

Combined events

Notes 
1.Marta Domínguez won the silver medal, but all her competitive results from 5 August 2009 until 8 July 2013 were disqualified for doping offences.

References 
Participants list

Nations at the 2010 European Athletics Championships
2010
Athletics Championships